Anura Bastian (born 30 July 1950) is a Sri Lankan politician. He was a former Deputy Minister of Defence and Member of Parliament (1978 - 1989). A favorite of J. R. Jayewardene, he succeeded his parliamentary seat when the latter became President of Sri Lanka. In 1983, he was appointed Deputy Minister of Defence.

References

Defence ministers of Sri Lanka
Members of the 8th Parliament of Sri Lanka
United National Party politicians
1950 births
Living people